Andrzej Juliusz Sarwa (born 12 April 1953 in Sandomierz) a Polish prose writer, poet, journalist. A member of the Polish Writers' Union and the Polish Journalists Association, he has received the Order of Merit of the Republic of Poland. He is an author and co-author of over 200 books and a few hundred articles from different fields, including theological works on eschatology and demonology. Some of them are on the required reading list for theology and religious studies students at Polish universities, including the Jagiellonian University in Kraków, The University of Łódź, Catholic University of Lublin, and Cardinal Stefan Wyszyński University in Warsaw.

Selected list of works

Prose 

 2013: Uwikłany (Entangled); Sandomierz: Wydawnictwo Diecezjalne
 2013: Szepty i cienie  (Whispers and Shadows); Sandomierz: Wydawnictwo Diecezjalne
 2013: Ziarna ocalenia (Grains of Salvation); Sandomierz: Wydawnictwo Diecezjalne

Poetry 

 1992: Tarnina (The Blackthorn); Sandomierz: Wydawnictwo Mandragora
 2000: Pochody (The Marchers); Sandomierz: ELSA Publishing House
 2015: Poezje (Poems); Sandomierz: Wydawnictwo Armoryka

Theological books 

 2002: Eschatologia Kościoła Wschodniego (Eschatology of Eastern Orthodox Church), Łodź: Wydawnictwo Ravi
 2002: Eschatologia Islamu (Eschatology of Islam), Łodź: Wydawnictwo Ravi
 2005: Eschatologia Zaratusztrianizmu (Eschatology of Zoroastrianism), Sandomierz: Wydawnictwo Mandragora

References

Sources 
 Andrzej Sarwa: Bibliography in Catalog Polish National Library
 Andrzej Sarwa: Presentation of the subject-object in Gość Niedzielny – Uwikłany w Sandomierz
 Andrzej Sarwa: Presentation of the subject-object in Gość Niedzielny – Thriller… teologiczny
 Andrzej Sarwa: Presentation of the subject-object in Gość Niedzielny – Sandomierzanin Roku 2015
 Andrzej Sarwa: Presentation of the subject-object in Andrzej Juliusz Sarwa, Un'anima e tre ali – Il blog di Paolo Statuti
 Andrzej Sarwa: in Catalog Bibliography Komisja ds. Kultu Bożego Episkopatu Polski
 Andrzej Sarwa: in Baza osób polskich - der polnischen Personendatenbank

Further reading 

 Ogorzałek, Małgorzata, editor (2013) Andrzej Sarwa. Twórczość i dokonania w 60. rocznicę urodzin. Wydawnictwo Spichlerz 
 Nowosielecka, Justyna, editor (2013) Twórczość niebanalna i eksperymentalna Andrzeja Sarwy. Wydawnictwo Spichlerz

External links 
 Andrzej Sarwa in TV Kielce
 Cyfroteka.pl Author: Andrzej Sarwa in Cyfroteka.pl
 Review in Biblia Horroru
 Andrzej Sarwa in Tarnobrzeg
 Polish Writers Union Warsaw
 Україна відкриває для себе Андрія Сарву

1953 births
Polish male novelists
Polish male poets
Recipients of the Order of Merit of the Republic of Poland
Living people
20th-century Polish novelists
21st-century Polish novelists
20th-century Polish poets
21st-century Polish poets
20th-century Polish male writers
21st-century Polish male writers